All-Negro Comics, published in 1947, was a single-issue, small-press American comic book that represents the first known comics magazine written and drawn solely by African-American writers and artists.

Publication history
African-American journalist Orrin Cromwell Evans was "the first black writer to cover general assignments for a mainstream white newspaper in the United States" when he joined the staff of the Philadelphia Record. Evans was a member of the NAACP and a strong proponent of racial equality. After the Record closed in 1947, Evans thought he could use the comic-book medium to further highlight "the splendid history of Negro journalism". Evans partnered with former Record editor Harry T. Saylor, Record sports editor Bill Driscoll, and two others to found the Philadelphia publishing company All-Negro Comics, Inc., with himself as president. In mid-1947, the company published one issue of All-Negro Comics, a 48-page, standard-sized comic book with a typical glossy color cover and newsprint interior. It was copyrighted July 15, 1947, with a June 1947 issue date, and its press run and distribution are unknown. Unlike other comic books of the time, it sold for 15 cents rather than 10 cents.

As writer Tom Christopher described, Evans

As one cultural historian notes of the era, "[W]hile there were a few heroic images of blacks created by blacks, such as the Jive Gray comic strip and All-Negro Comics, these images did not circulate outside of pre-civil rights segregated black communities."

Evans attempted to publish a second issue but was unable to purchase the newsprint required. One writer believes Evans was blocked from doing so by prejudiced distributors, as well as from competing, white-owned publishers (such as Parents Magazine Press and Fawcett Comics) which began producing their own black-themed titles.

The Official Overstreet Comic Book Price Guide, a standard reference, considers the single issue "rare" and notes, "Seldom found in fine or mint condition; many copies have brown pages."

Contents
Time magazine in 1947 called All-Negro Comics "the first to be drawn by Negro artists and peopled entirely by Negro characters." In describing lead feature "Ace Harlem", it said, "The villains were a couple of zoot-suited, jive-talking Negro muggers, whose presence in anyone else's comics might have brought up complaints of racial 'distortion.' Since it was all in the family, Evans thought no Negro readers would mind." The protagonist "Ace Harlem" was an African-American police detective; the characters in the "Lion Man and Bubba" feature were meant to inspire black people's pride in their African heritage.

Stories 

 One-page introductory editorial, "All-Negro Comics: Presenting Another First in Negro History"
 "Ace Harlem", a private detective feature drawn by John Terrell
 "The Little Dew Dillies", a children's feature starring cherub-like creatures only babies can see and talk to, drawn by Cooper
 "Ezekiel's Manhunt", a two-page boy's-adventure text story
 "Lion Man and Bubba", starring a college-educated African American sent by the United Nations on a mission to a uranium deposit on Africa's Gold Coast, where he adopted the mischievous orphan Bubba. Drawn by George J. Evans, Jr. (no relation to Caucasian comic-book and comic-strip artist George Evans). One modern-day writer said Lion Man "wore the obligatory leotard costume of the comic hero", though the comic's cover and interior pages depict him in loin cloth.
 "Hep Chicks on Parade", spot-illustration gags with highly stylized women wearing exaggerated fashions, signed "Len"
 "Lil' Eggie", by Terrell, about henpecked husband Egbert and his wife
 "Sugarfoot", a humor feature, drawn by Cravat, starring traveling musicians Sugarfoot and Snake Oil, who try to woo a farmer's daughter. Evans' editorial said the feature's creators hoped "to recapture the almost lost humor of the loveable wandering Negro minstrel of the past."
 "Remember — Crime  Doesn't Pay, Kids!", a one-page public service announcement and next-issue promo, with Ace Harlem

See also

 Portrayal of black people in comics
 African characters in comics
 Martin Luther King and the Montgomery Story
Black Panther (comics)
Lobo (Dell Comics)
 Real Deal
 Race film
 Blaxploitation

References

External links

 
 All-Negro Comics scans

Comics magazines published in the United States
Magazines established in 1947
Magazines disestablished in 1947
Fictional African-American people
African-American magazines
1947 comics debuts
One-shot comic titles
Defunct American comics
Black people in comics
African-American comics